Indian River in the Lower Peninsula of Michigan is a  waterway in Cheboygan County flowing from Burt Lake at  to Mullett Lake at . The unincorporated community of Indian River is named after the river.

The river is part of the great Inland Waterway of Michigan, by which one can boat from Crooked Lake several miles east of Petoskey on the Little Traverse Bay of Lake Michigan across the northern tip of the lower peninsula's "mitten" to Cheboygan on Lake Huron.

References 

Rivers of Michigan
Rivers of Cheboygan County, Michigan
Tributaries of Lake Huron